Earth, Wind & Fire: Live is a DVD released by the band Earth, Wind & Fire in 2001 on Image Entertainment, and Polygram Video.  The DVD has been certified Gold in the US by the RIAA.

Overview
Earth, Wind & Fire: Live was recorded during a 1994 concert by the band in Japan.

Critical reception
Perry Siebert of Allmusic described Earth, Wind & Fire: Live as "a great disc for fans of the band that makes good use of DVD technology with the multiple angle capabilities".

Set list
"September"
"Let Your Feelings Show"
"Let's Groove"
"Runnin'"
"Boogie Wonderland"
"Can't Hide Love"
"Fantasy"
"Kalimba Interlude"
"Evil"
"Shining Star"
"Keep Your Head to the Sky"
"Reasons"
"Sing a Song"
"That's the Way of the World"
"Wouldn't Change a Thing About You"
"After the Love Has Gone"
"System of Survival"
Bonus: Encore - "Sunday Morning"

Credits
Maurice White -Vocals/timbales/kalimba
Phillip Bailey- Vocals/percussion
Verdine White - Bass
Ralph Johnson - Vocals/percussion
Sheldon Reynolds - Vocals/guitar
Sonny Emory - Drums
Freddie Ravel - Vocals/keyboards/musical direction
Morris Pleasure - Keyboards 
Raymond Lee Brown - Trumpet
Gary Bias - Saxophones
Reggie Young - Trombone
Michael McKnight - Keyboards

References

Earth, Wind & Fire video albums
2001 video albums
Live video albums
2001 live albums